William Grafton Austin (January 6, 1868 – July 15, 1929) was an American enlisted man and officer in the U.S. Army who served with the 7th Cavalry Regiment during the Indian Wars. Austin received the Medal of Honor for extraordinary gallantry at the Battle of Wounded Knee, but now called the Wounded Knee Massacre, on December 29, 1890.

Biography
William Grafton Austin was born on January 6, 1868, in Grimes County or Galveston, Texas. He enlisted in E Troop, 7th Cavalry Regiment of the U.S. Army in New York City on January 24, 1887; his age is recorded as 24 (birth year ). He fought in the Battle of Wounded Knee on December 29, 1890, and was awarded the Medal of Honor on June 17, 1891, for actions "while the Indians were concealed in a ravine, assisted men on the skirmish line, directing their fire, etc., and using every effort to dislodge the enemy". He was discharged as a sergeant on January 23, 1892, at Fort Riley, Kansas.

After his discharge from the military, Austin returned to Savannah, Georgia where he was engaged in the Cotton business. He joined the Savannah Volunteer Guards in 1894 and rose in rank from private to captain of Company A, which unit he commanded in the Spanish–American War as part of the Second Georgia Regiment of Volunteers. Austin served as Chief of Police of Savannah and later owned and operated an automobile dealership.

During World War I, Austin was appointed as commander of the 302nd Stevedore Regiment. In 1919 Austin is listed as a colonel in the Officers' Reserve Corps in the quartermaster section in the State of California. He later retired to Palo Alto, California where he died on July 15, 1929.

Medal of Honor citation
Rank and organization: Sergeant, Company E, 7th U.S. Cavalry. Place and date: At Wounded Knee Creek, S. Dak., December 29, 1890. Entered service at: New York, N.Y. Birth: Galveston, Tex. Date of issue: June 27, 1891.

Citation:

While the Indians were concealed in a ravine, assisted men on the skirmish line, directing their fire, etc., and using every effort to dislodge the enemy.

See also

 List of Medal of Honor recipients

References

Further reading
 Wilson, D. Ray. Terror on the Plains: A Clash of Cultures. Dundee, Illinois: Crossroads Communications, 1999. 

1868 births
1929 deaths
United States Army colonels
American military personnel of the Indian Wars
United States Army Medal of Honor recipients
People from Galveston, Texas
Military personnel from New York City
American Indian Wars recipients of the Medal of Honor
Pine Ridge Campaign
United States Army personnel of World War I
Military personnel from Texas